The YoungIn Museum of Literature is a literature museum in Pyeongchang-dong, Jongno-gu, Seoul in South Korea.

External links
Official site

See also
List of museums in South Korea

Museums in Seoul
Literary museums in South Korea